"Ball and Biscuit" is the eighth track on the album Elephant by American alternative rock band The White Stripes.

Composition and lyrics

Musical structure
The song commits to the structure of traditional 12-bar blues, a three-chord format in which the first line of each verse is repeated and then answered.

Lyrics

The lyrics follow the perspective of a self-purported seventh son as he apparently courts a woman. He mentions that it is quite possible that he is the girl's "third man" and that the girl is ambivalent towards him, but he persistently tries to impress her with his claim to be a seventh son.

The title could refer to the STC Coles 4021 "Ball and Biscuit" microphone that was used at Toe Rag Studios during the Elephant recording sessions.

The Seventh Son is based on the American folk legend version of the belief that the seventh son of a seventh son would be granted supernatural powers, which the character of the song claims to possess in the form of superhuman strength. A recollection of similar folklore is frequently found in the Blues and derivatives; notably, Willie Dixon sang a blues song entitled "The Seventh Son". The use of the Seventh Son may have been inspired by Jack White's own family situation; he was the seventh and final son in a family of nine children.

Reception
"Ball and Biscuit" has generated a significant amount of commentary even though it was never released as a single. It was, however, voted in a Rolling Stone Reader's Poll to be the greatest Jack White song "by a landslide". In her review of Elephant, Kitty Empire described the song as "...astonishing, with Jack White playing on his knees, his sexual promises punctuated by liquid guitar emissions." In 2011, the Washington Posts David Malitz described the song as "perhaps the White Stripes' definitive statement."

It has also been used numerous times in popular culture. It was featured in as the background music for the Captain Morgan advertisement "Glass" and was heard  at the beginning of the 2010 film The Social Network.

On October 10, 2020, Jack White performed a version of the song on Saturday Night Live after stepping in and replacing Morgan Wallen on short notice.

Cover versions
Bob Dylan performed the song live at a concert in Detroit, Michigan on March 17, 2004, for which he was joined by White (making a surprise appearance). It is the only instance, to date, of Dylan covering a song that was written in the 21st century. An audience recording of the performance was made available to stream on The White Stripes' official website in March 2004.

References

2003 songs
2020 singles
The White Stripes songs
Songs written by Jack White
Blues rock songs
Punk blues songs